General Richardson may refer to:

Cecil R. Richardson (born c. 1947), U.S. Air Force major general
Charles Leslie Richardson (1908–1994), British Army general
Duke Richardson (1980s–2020s), U.S. Air Force lieutenant general
George Richardson (Indian Army officer) (1847–1931), British Indian Army lieutenant general
George Spafford Richardson (1868–1938), New Zealand Military Forces major general
Israel B. Richardson (1815–1862), U.S. Army major general
James M. Richardson (general) (born 1960), U.S. Army lieutenant general
James L. Richardson (1909–1987), U.S. Army lieutenant general
John Richardson (Australian Army officer) (1880–1954), Australian Army major general
John Richardson (Canadian MP) (1932–2010), Canadian Forces brigadier general
John B. Richardson (1990s–2020s), U.S. Army major general
John Soame Richardson (1836–1896), British Army major general
Laura J. Richardson (born 1963), U.S. Army lieutenant general
Robert Richardson (British Army officer) (1929–2014), British Army lieutenant general
Robert C. Richardson III (1918–2011), U.S. Air Force brigadier general
Robert C. Richardson Jr. (1882–1954), U.S. Army four-star general
Robert V. Richardson (1820–1870), Confederate States Army brigadier general
Tony Richardson (British Army officer) (1922–2015), British Army major general
Wilds P. Richardson (1861–1929), U.S. Army brigadier general
William P. Richardson (Ohio politician) (1824–1886), Union Army brevet brigadier general

See also
Attorney General Richardson (disambiguation)